Leptodactylodon wildi is a species of frogs in the family Arthroleptidae.

It is endemic to Cameroon.
Its natural habitats are subtropical or tropical moist montane forests and freshwater springs.
It is threatened by habitat loss.

References

Leptodactylodon
Endemic fauna of Cameroon
Amphibians described in 2000
Taxonomy articles created by Polbot